Dima and Lama Hattab (born December 31, 1980) are twin sisters from Jordan best known for being the first female ultramarathon runners in the Middle East to take part in the endurance race Marathon des Sables.

Biography 

Born in the Jordanian capital Amman, the Hattab twins started their running career when they were 18 years old. Their potential ability came into light after only one year, when they took part in the 1999 Dead Sea ultramarathon. In the half-marathon competition, Lama came in 3rd, while Dima finished 4th.

Being women, in addition to their choice of such a difficult sport, made them well-known figures in the Middle East, appearing in many shows on famous channels like Jazeera sport and Orbit, and also making the cover page of various magazines.

But in spite of the fact of their fame, the Hattab twins are facing a lot of difficulties in taking their career to the next level, mainly due to the lack of sponsorship in the Middle East for such endurance sports, especially for women. Sometimes they had to depend on their own financial resources, and other times they were lucky to get an unlikely sponsor at the last minute.

Jordanian female long-distance runners
Living people
1980 births
Twin sportspeople
Jordanian twins
Female ultramarathon runners